El Ayoun may refer to:
 El Aaiún, the capital of Western Sahara
 El Ayoun (Tunisia), a city in Kasserine Governorate in Tunisia
 Hajeb El Ayoun
 Ayoun el Atrous, Mauritania
 Ayun, Chitral

See also 
 El Aioun (disambiguation)